Muriel FitzRoy, 1st Viscountess Daventry   (8 August 1869 – 8 July 1962) was a British aristocrat and the wife of Edward FitzRoy, who was Speaker of the House of Commons from 1928 until his death in 1943.

Biography
Lady Daventry was born Muriel Douglas-Pennant, elder daughter of Lt Col Hon Archibald Charles Henry Douglas-Pennant, second son of Edward Douglas-Pennant, 1st Baron Penrhyn.

On 6 May 1943, just over two months after the death of her husband, she was created Viscountess Daventry, of Daventry in the County of Northampton, a viscountcy being the customary retirement honour for Speakers.  To date, she was the last peeress to be granted an hereditary peerage.

Edward Fitzroy and Lady Daventry had four children:

 Robert Oliver Fitzroy, 2nd Viscount Daventry (born 10 January 1893, died 7 May 1976)
 Hon Nancy Jean Fitzroy (born 31 May 1894, died Feb 1984)
 Captain Michael Algernon Fitzroy (born 27 June 1895, killed in action 15 April 1915)
 Commander Hon John Maurice FitzRoy Newdegate (born 20 March 1897, died 1976), father of Francis FitzRoy Newdegate, 3rd Viscount Daventry

References

1869 births
1962 deaths
Viscounts in the Peerage of the United Kingdom
Commanders of the Order of the British Empire
Dames of Grace of the Order of St John
Muriel
Hereditary peeresses created by George VI